Asse is a former Samtgemeinde ("collective municipality") in the district of Wolfenbüttel, in Lower Saxony, Germany. It is situated approximately 10 km southeast of Wolfenbüttel. On 1 January 2015 it merged with the Samtgemeinde Schöppenstedt to form the new Samtgemeinde Elm-Asse.

It is named after the Asse, a small chain of hills in the municipality. Its seat was in the village Remlingen.

Municipalities 

The Samtgemeinde Asse consisted of the following municipalities:
 Denkte
 Hedeper
 Kissenbrück
 Remlingen
 Roklum
 Semmenstedt
 Wittmar

References

Wolfenbüttel (district)
Former Samtgemeinden in Lower Saxony